The Chinese lizard gudgeon (Saurogobio dabryi) is a species of cyprinid fish found in the Amur basin to the Pearl River in China, Mongolia and the Korean peninsula. It is also found in Vietnam.

Etymology
Named in honor of Pierre Dabry de Thiersant (1826-1898), fish culturist, French counsel to China, and student of Chinese fishes, who sent specimens to the Muséum d’Histoire naturelle de Paris.

References

Saurogobio
Taxa named by Pieter Bleeker
Fish described in 1871